Mykola Anatoliyovych Ishchenko (born 9 March 1983) is a Ukrainian footballer who plays for Livyi Bereh Kyiv.

Career
After three seasons at FC Shakhtar Donetsk Ishchenko found it difficult to break through in the starting line up. The former captain of FC Karpaty Lviv was signed by FC Shakhtar Donetsk for $3.3 million transfer fee. He made his premier league debut against FC Lviv. Despite the 2–0 loss of Shakhtar, Ishchenko was voted man-of-the-match

He played for FC Metalist Kharkiv in the Ukrainian Premier League.

Honours

Club

Shakhtar Donetsk
 Ukrainian Premier League: 2009–10, 2010–11
 Ukrainian Cup: 2010–11
 Ukrainian Super Cup: 2008, 2010
 UEFA Cup: 2008–09

International

Ukraine U21
 UEFA European Under-21 Championship runner-up: 2006

References

External links
 Personal statistics at UAF website
 

1983 births
Living people
Ukrainian footballers
Ukraine international footballers
Ukraine under-21 international footballers
FC Shakhtar Donetsk players
UEFA Cup winning players
FC Karpaty Lviv players
FC Karpaty-2 Lviv players
FC Karpaty-3 Lviv players
FC Mariupol players
Ukrainian Premier League players
Ukrainian First League players
Ukrainian Second League players
FC Metalist Kharkiv players
FC Stal Kamianske players
Association football defenders
NK Veres Rivne players
FC Chornomorets Odesa players
FC Livyi Bereh Kyiv players
Footballers from Kyiv